Zwierzyniec Pierwszy is a village in the administrative district of Gmina Opatów, within Kłobuck County, Silesian Voivodeship, in southern Poland.

The village has a population of 435.

References

Zwierzyniec Pierwszy